Paola Colonna (c. 1378 – 3 November 1450) was the lady of Piombino from 1441 until 1445.

She was born in Genazzano as the daughter of Agapito Colonna, lord of Genazzano. Her brother Giordano was shortly Prince of Salerno and Duke of Venosa, while her brother Oddo would become Pope Martin V. On 18 June 1396 she was married to Gherardo Appiani, lord of Piombino. At his death she held the regency for their son Iacopo. When the latter also died, she left the principate, against the legitimate heir Emanuele Appiani, to her daughter Caterina, married to the condottiero Rinaldo Orsini.

She died in Piombino in 1450.

See also
Colonna family

References
 Mauro Carrara, Signori e principi di Piombino, Bandecchi & Vivaldi, Pontedera 1996.

1370s births
1450 deaths
People from Genazzano
Lords of Piombino
Paola
15th-century women rulers